The Aberdeen Synagogue and Jewish Community Centre (ASJCC) maintains a shul (synagogue) on Dee Street in the centre of Aberdeen (UK).  This is the northernmost synagogue in the British Isles.

History
Several Jews were awarded medical degrees from Aberdeen in the 18th century, but they did not live in Aberdeen (the degrees were awarded in absentia).  Jews were definitely living in Aberdeen by the late 19th century.  The Aberdeen Hebrew Congregation was founded in 1893, and initially worshipped in a flat on Marischal Street.  In 1945 the congregation bought a house on Dee St, and converted it into a shul and community centre.  In 2016 Aberdeen Hebrew Congregation was reorganised and renamed as Aberdeen Synagogue and Jewish Community Centre.

Community
According to the census, there are about 250 Jews in the Aberdeen area (city and shire).  The community is mostly incomers who come to Aberdeen to work or study.  The ASJCC tries to support all Jews in the Aberdeen area, regardless of which type of Judaism they follow.

There is a burial area for Jews in Grove Cemetery.

There is also a Jewish Students Society in Aberdeen, which works closely with the ASJCC.

Services
The community has not had a permanent full-time rabbi since the 1950s.  Most services are led by lay members of the community, but rabbis do visit to lead services on major holidays and events. ASJCC's website has up-to-date details about services and events.

See also
History of the Jews in Scotland
Scottish Council of Jewish Communities

References

External links
Aberdeen Synagogue and Jewish Community Centre
University of Aberdeen Jewish Society

Synagogues in Scotland
Aberdeen